Mr. Rabbit and the Lovely Present, written by Charlotte Zolotow and illustrated by Maurice Sendak, is a 1962 picture book published by HarperCollins. It was a Caldecott Medal Honor Book for 1963 and was one of Sendak's Caldecott Honor Medal of a total of seven during his career. Sendak won the Caldecott Medal in 1964 for Where the Wild Things Are, which he both authored and illustrated. Mr. Rabbit and the Lovely Present was re-issued by HarperCollins in 1999 in hardcover format as part of a project to re-issue 22 Sendak works, including several authored by Zolotow.

Description
The story, written by Zolotow, is told in past tense from the third-person point of view. It does not feature rhyming or nonsense words but makes use of repeating sentence patterns. The illustrations by Sendak support the story by depicting actions not textually described.

Synopsis
An unnamed little girl meets a rabbit and asks for his help in finding her mother a birthday present. The cover art shows the girl asking the Rabbit for help as he sits on a rock. He then takes her on a journey to find the perfect present for her mom.  On their journey, the little girl tells Mr. Rabbit that her mother likes "red, green, yellow and blue". Mr. Rabbit then suggests that the little girl should get her mother "red underwear" but the little girl refuses to give her mother such a gift. Mr. Rabbit then takes the girl to an apple tree. She agrees an apple would be a lovely present for her mom. Mr. Rabbit and the little girl then proceed to find another "present" for her mom. Mr. Rabbit suggests that the little girl get her mother something yellow. They both agree that a banana would be the perfect fruit for her mom. Mr. Rabbit and the little girl fill a little brown basket with blue, yellow, green, and red fruits. Mr. Rabbit walks the girl home.

References

Zolotow, Charlotte. "Mr. Rabbit and the Lovely Present Children's Book Read Aloud, Written by Charlotte Zolotow." YouTube. YouTube, 1 June 1962. Web. 15 June 2015.
Sendak, Maurice. "Mr. Rabbit and the Lovely Present, 1963 Caldecott Honor Book." Mr. Rabbit and the Lovely Present, 1963 Caldecott Honor Book. HarperCollins, 1962. Web. 15 June 2015.

1962 children's books
American children's books
American picture books
Caldecott Honor-winning works
English-language books
Fictional children
Books about rabbits and hares
Birthdays in fiction
Children's books about friendship
United States in fiction
Forests in fiction
Picture books by Maurice Sendak
Harper & Row books